(born February 17, 1978) is a Japanese wrestler, currently working for Kaientai Dojo. He also appears sporadically for Big Japan Pro Wrestling and 666.

Championships and accomplishments 
Dramatic Dream Team
DDT Extreme Championship (1 time)
Kaientai Dojo
Chiba Six Man Tag Team Championship (1 time) - with Hiro Tonai & Yuki Sato
Independent World Junior Heavyweight Championship (1 time)
Strongest-K Tag Team Championship (6 times, current) - with Makoto Oishi (3, current), Hiro Tonai (1), Hiroshi Fukuda (1), and Kaji Tomato (1)
UWA World Middleweight Championship (3 times)
WEW Hardcore Tag Team Championship (2 times)
EX Tournament (2015)
K-Survivor Tournament (2014) - with Ayumu Honda, Bambi and Kaji Tomato
Best Tag Team Match (2009) with Makoto Oishi vs. Gentaro and Yoshiya on August 9
Best Tag Team Match (2011) with Makoto Oishi vs. Prince Devitt and Ryusuke Taguchi on April 17
Best Tag Team Match (2012) with Hiro Tonai vs. Kengo Mashimo and Ryuichi Sekine on July 8
Best Tag Team Match (2014) with Kaji Tomato vs. Hi69 and Yuji Hino on November 3
Michinoku Pro Wrestling
Tohoku Tag Team Championship (1 time)

References

External links 
 

Japanese male professional wrestlers
Living people
1978 births
21st-century professional wrestlers
Tohoku Tag Team Champions
Independent World Junior Heavyweight Champions
WEW Hardcore Tag Team Champions
Chiba Six Man Tag Team Champions
Strongest-K Tag Team Champions
UWA World Middleweight Champions